The 19063 / 19064 Udhna–Danapur Express is an Express train belonging to Western Railway zone that runs between  and  in India. It is currently being operated with 19063/19064 train numbers on a bi-weekly basis.

Service

The 19063/Udhna–Danapur Express has an average speed of 54 km/hr and covers 1593 km in 29h 15m.
The 19064/Danapur–Udhna Express has an average speed of 53 km/hr and covers 1593 km in 30h 05m.

Route & Halts 

The important halts of the train are:

Coach composition

The train has standard ICF rakes with max speed of 110 kmph. The train consists of 21 coaches:

 1 AC II Tier
 2 AC III Tier
 8 Sleeper coaches
 8 General Unreserved
 2 Seating cum Luggage Rake

Traction

The route is now fully electrified. Both trains are hauled by a Vadodara or Itarsi-based WAP-4 locomotive from Udhna Junction to Danapur and vice versa.

Direction reversal

Train reverses its direction 1 times:

Rake sharing

The train shares its rake with 19057/19058 Udhna–Banaras Express and 12911/12912 Valsad–Haridwar Superfast Express.

See also 

 Udhna Junction railway station
 Danapur railway station
 Surat–Chhapra Tapti Ganga Express
 Surat–Muzaffarpur Express
 Surat–Bhagalpur Express

Notes

References

External links 

 19063/Udhna-Danapur Bi Weekly Express
 19064/Danapur–Udhna Bi Weekly Express

Transport in Surat
Transport in Patna
Express trains in India
Rail transport in Gujarat
Rail transport in Maharashtra
Rail transport in Madhya Pradesh
Rail transport in Uttar Pradesh
Rail transport in Bihar
Railway services introduced in 2015